The 1938 Michigan gubernatorial election was held on November 8, 1938. Republican nominee Frank Fitzgerald defeated incumbent Democratic Frank Murphy with 52.78% of the vote.

General election

Candidates
Major party candidates
Frank Fitzgerald, Republican
Frank Murphy, Democratic
Other candidates
Nahum Burnett, Socialist
Clayton O'Donohue, Socialist Labor
Juliet K. Hammond, American
Vahan K. Beshgetoor, Commonwealth
Howard L. Holmes, Square Deal
Bowen R. Gover, Protestants United

Results

Primaries
The primary elections occurred on September 13, 1938.

Republican Primary

Democratic primary

References

1938
Michigan
Gubernatorial
November 1938 events